Arki is a town, tehsil and Nagar panchayat in Solan district of Himachal Pradesh, India. The town is known for its fort built in the late 18th century when Arki was the capital of the erstwhile princely hill state of Baghal.

History

Arki was the capital of the princely Hill state of Baghal, which was founded by Rana Ajai Dev, a Panwar Rajput from Dhar state in Central India. The state was founded 11th century and Arki was declared its capital by Rana Sabha Chand in 1643. Its main attraction, Arki Fort is a now a heritage hotel managed by the ruling family and a lovely place to visit.

The fort was captured by the Gurkhas in 1806. Rana Jagat Singh, the ruler of Baghal, had to take refuge in Nalagarh. From 1806 to 1815, the Gurkha General Amar Singh Thapa holds Arki as his headquarters to make further advances into Himachal Pradesh as far as Kangra.

The Gurkhas were, however, driven out by Rana Jagat Singh assisted by Sir David Ochterlony and the British forces during the Gurkha War in 1815–1816. Thereafter Rana Jagat Singh regained control of Arki.

Rana Kishan Singh, who ruled the state from 1840 to 1867, developed the town of Arki in a planned manner. The Rana was a far-sighted ruler and built horse and mule tracks to connect Arki with Shimla and Bilaspur. Many artisans, scholars and businessman from other parts of India settled in Arki during his reign as he provided them with tax free land free of cost.

The Rana was a patron of arts and had muralled interiors installed in the Arki Fort in 1850. These murals are  prime attraction among tourists even today.

The Last ruler of Baghal was Shri Raja Rajander Singh (1928–2010)  who overhauled the administration and introduced radical constitutional reforms. After Indian independence he was an M.L.A., 1st Commandant General of Home Guards, Director of Civil Defence.
During the Indian Rebellion of 1857, Rana Kishan Singh assisted the British forces and for which he was presented the title of Raja. Another revolt was suppressed in 1905 with the help of the superintendent of Shimla Hill States. This was as payback for the support he had received earlier to drive Gurkha out.

Geography
It has an average elevation of 1045 metres (3428 feet).

Arki is located in the Siwalik range of Himalaya mountains. Due to its high altitude, Arki enjoys a pleasant weather in the summers with the temperatures hovering between 26 °C and 32 °C. The winters are chilly and the temperature ranges between 4 °C and 8 °C. The rainfall is moderate and occurs mainly during July and August.

Arki is known for its caves and cave temples among which Lutru Mahadev and Mutru Mahadev are very famous.

Sair Fair
The Sair Fair is an annual two-day event held at Arki on sakranti of Ashwin (16/17 September). The fair was famous for buffalo fights . Local people used to train their buffaloes for the event but since 2015 the event is not taking place.  The fair is attended by millions of people every year. Night programs in this fair are always different and people of Arki enjoy the day a lot.

Demographics
 India census, Arki had a population of 3040. Males constitute 50.52% of the population and females 49.48%. Arki has an average literacy rate of 94%, higher than the national average of 74.04% (census 2011). 13% of the population is under 6 years of age.

Places of interest
 Lutru Mahadev Temple was built in 1621 by king of Baghal. Shiva appeared in his dream and ordered him to make his temple. There is a Shivalinga here. It is 4 km from Arki. Shivratri is also very popular in Lutru Mahadev Temple.
 Jakholi Devi Temple (Badhra Kali Temple) was made around 1650. This temple is 7 km from Arki. It is built by king of Baghal for Bhadra Kali.
 Dhundan known for its scenery and temples. This is also famous for its Guru Matth and Cheenj.
 Bakhalag is a place of interest which is around 9 km from Arki. This small village is known for its scenery.
 Baniya Devi is a place in dense forest where a temple dedicated to Goddess Van Durga is present since ancient times.
 The only private hospital in Arki is K. Vardaan Health Care Centre, run by Dr. Vimal Pankaj Katoch, ex. EMO Ajit Neuro hospital Amritsar.
 Arki Fort was built between 1695 and 1700 by Rana Prithvi Singh is in the town.
 Mutru Mahaved Temple is a temple in the town.
 Folklore say that the four temples on the sides of the village save them from any difficult situation from nature: Lutru Mahadev Temple, Kali Mata Temple, Devdhar Temple and Shakni Temple.
 "Shiv Guffa" Kunihar
 Temple of "Dev Dhar Wala" Isht Dev Of Baghal State At "Sairi Ghat". Where fair held in "Jaieshth month" (may month) every year.
 Chamyawal Village - A place of waterfalls, 4 KM away from Arki.
Manjhu Khad - known for its views.
Batal Village - 4 km away from Arki and the most populated village of tehsil Arki.
Darlaghat - Industrial area, known for Ambuja factory, 'Truckon aur Traalo ka Sehar' 
Kooni Khad - 9 KM away from Arki.
Batal College - 4 KM away from Arki. About 1500 students get quality education from this college every year.
Antique "Dhuni" in Aslu village.

Gallery

References

Cities and towns in Solan district
1643 establishments in Asia
Tehsils of Himachal Pradesh